The Politics of Azerbaijan takes place in a framework of a semi-presidential republic, with the President of Azerbaijan as the head of state, and the Prime Minister of Azerbaijan as head of government. Executive power is exercised by the president and the government. Legislative power is vested in both the government and parliament. The Judiciary is nominally independent of the executive and the legislature. 

The political system in Azerbaijan is authoritarian, as elections are not free and fair, political opponents are repressed, civil rights are limited, human rights abuses are widespread, corruption is rampant, and power is concentrated in the hands of President Ilham Aliyev and his extended family.

Political history
Azerbaijan declared its independence from the former Soviet Union on August 30, 1991, with Ayaz Mutalibov, former First Secretary of the Azerbaijani Communist Party, becoming the country's first President. Following a massacre of Azerbaijanis at Khojali in Nagorno-Karabakh in March 1992, Mutalibov resigned and the country experienced a period of political fragility. The old guard returned Mutalibov to power in May 1992, but less than a week later his efforts to suspend scheduled presidential elections and ban all political activity prompted the opposition Azerbaijan Popular Front Party (PFP) to organize a resistance movement and take power. Among its reforms, the PFP dissolved the predominantly Communist Supreme Soviet and transferred its functions to the 50-member upper house of the legislature, the National Council.

Elections in June 1992 resulted in the selection of PFP leader Abulfaz Elchibey as the country's second president. The national presidential elections with 7 candidates were held on 7 June 1992 in which Elchibey was elected the President of Azerbaijan, gaining 54% of votes and becoming Azerbaijan's first democratically elected, non-communist president. During the summer of 1992, Elchibey secured the full withdrawal of the Soviet army from Azerbaijan, which became the first and only former Soviet republic (after the Baltic states) free of Soviet military presence. At the same time, Elchibey's government established the national Caspian Navy and managed to reach an agreement with Russia on receiving one-quarter of the Soviet Caspian Navy based in Baku.

The National Council conferred presidential powers upon its new speaker, Heydar Aliyev, former First Secretary of the Azerbaijani Communist Party (1969–81) and later a member of the Soviet Union's Politburo, the KGB, and USSR Deputy Prime Minister (until 1987). Elchibey was formally deposed by a national referendum in August 1993, and Aliyev was elected to a 5-year term as President in October with only token opposition. Aliyev won re-election to another 5-year term in 1998. According to conclusions of OSCE ODIHR election observation report "clear political will was demonstrated by the authorities of the Republic of Azerbaijan to significantly improve on the election practice of the country. The efforts in this direction were initiated in the late spring of 1998 by a review of the election legislation to put it in line with OSCE commitments, by the formal abolishment of censorship in August 1998 and by the final approval of the new Citizenship Law in late September 1998. In this way the authorities responded positively to concerns raised by the international community and indicated their willingness to meet international standards in the conduct of the election process".

The Speaker of Parliament stood next in line to the President, but the constitution was changed at the end of 2002: now the premier is next in line. In August 2003, İlham Aliyev was appointed as premier. In the October 2003 presidential elections, İlham Aliyev was the winner and was sworn in as president at the end of the same month, and Rasizade was appointed premier again.

Elections in Azerbaijan tend to be fairly predictable affairs, with little analysis needed. President Ilham Aliyev and his New Azerbaijan Party keep an iron grip on power through fraudulent votes; international observers have never deemed an election in the country to be free and fair. In April 2018, President Ilham Aliyev secured his fourth consecutive term in the election that was boycotted by the main opposition parties as fraudulent.

Executive branch

|President
|İlham Aliyev
|New Azerbaijan Party (YAP)
|15 October 2003
|-
|Vice President
|Mehriban Aliyeva
|New Azerbaijan Party (YAP)
|21 February 2017
|-
|Prime Minister
|Ali Asadov
|Independent
|8 October 2019
|}
The head of state and head of government are separate from the country's law-making body. President is the head of the state and head of executive branch. The people elect the president; the Vice President is appointed by the President and the Prime Minister is nominated by the President and confirmed by the National Assembly of Azerbaijan.  Presidential term is 7 years. The President appoints all cabinet-level government administrators (ministers, heads of other central executive bodies) and heads of local executive bodies.

Since 2008, the Constitution of Azerbaijan was amended, abolishing any term limit for the office of President. Last Constitutional reform took place in September 2016 and introduced the institute of vice presidency.

President 
According to the Constitution of the Republic of Azerbaijan, the President of the Republic of Azerbaijan is the head of state and has executive power. The President of the Republic of Azerbaijan represents the country in internal and external affairs. The President of the Republic of Azerbaijan ensures the independence, territorial integrity of Azerbaijan, guarantees compliance with international treaties.

The President in Azerbaijan is elected for a 7-year term on the basis of general suffrage. Any citizen of the Republic of Azerbaijan has the right to vote, who has been living in Azerbaijani territory for more than 10 years, has a higher education and does not have dual citizenship and obligations to the other states, and also not convicted for a serious crime, can become a presidential candidate.

The decision to dismiss the President of the Republic of Azerbaijan is put before the National Assembly on the initiative of the Constitutional Court on the basis of the Supreme Court's decision. The resolution on dismissal of the president is adopted by the majority (95/125) of the votes of the deputies of the National Assembly and within 7 days is signed by the chairman of the Constitutional Court.

The President has the right to immunity. The authorization of the president include:
 assignment and dismissal of vice-presidents
 assignment of elections to the National Assembly of the Republic of Azerbaijan
 submission to the National Assembly for approval of the state budget, military doctrine
 approval of economic and social programs
 assignment and dismissal of the Prime Minister of the Republic of Azerbaijan (with the consent of the Milli Mejlis)
 submission to the National Assembly of proposals on the assignment of judges of the Constitutional, Supreme, Appeals and other courts of the Republic of Azerbaijan
 assignment and dismissal of the Prosecutor General of the Republic of Azerbaijan (with the consent of the Milli Mejlis)
 creation of local and central executive bodies
 formation or dissolution of the Cabinet of Ministers of the Republic of Azerbaijan
 assignment and dismissal of members of the Cabinet of Ministers of the Republic of Azerbaijan
 cancellation of the decision of the Cabinet of Ministers
 assignment and dismissal of the command staff of the Armed Forces of the Republic of Azerbaijan
 Formation of the Administration of the President of the Republic of Azerbaijan
 assignment of the head of the Administration of the President of the Republic of Azerbaijan
 Formation of the Security Council of the Republic of Azerbaijan
 referendum assignment
 assignment of early elections
 pardon of prisoners
 rewarding with awards, titles
 signature and publication of laws
 announcement of an emergency and martial law
 the declaration of war and the conclusion of peace (with the consent of the Milli Majlis)

Vice President 
The Vice-President of Azerbaijan is a group of posts following the President of the Republic of Azerbaijan. The President himself appoints and dismisses the first vice-president and vice-presidents. With the early resignation of the president, within 60 days, as long as new elections are organized, the president's powers are fulfilled by the First Vice-President of Azerbaijan. The First Vice-President of Azerbaijan enjoys inviolability; can not be detained, brought to criminal responsibility, except in cases of detention at the scene of a crime, can not be searched or personally searched.

Any citizen of the Azerbaijan Republic with a higher education who has the right to vote and has no obligations to other states can become a vice-president of Azerbaijan. Vice-presidents have the right to immunity.

Legislative branch 

The National Assembly of Azerbaijan  is the legislative branch of government in Azerbaijan. The unicameral National Assembly has 125 deputies: previously 100 members were elected for five-year terms in single-seat constituencies and 25 were members elected by proportional representation; as of the latest election, however, all 125 deputies are returned from single-member constituencies. Voting is free, individual and secret. Candidates may be self-nominated or presented by political parties, their blocs or groups of voters. All citizens over 18 years of age have the right to vote, except those recognised incapable by court. Every citizen of at least 25 years of age may be elected with certain exceptions (i.e. dual citizenship, liabilities towards a foreign state, holding a position in the executive or judicial branches of power, remunerated activities - with certain exceptions, exercise of a religious profession, incapacity confirmed by court, conviction for a serious crime or serving a sentence). The integrity of election results is validated in respect of each candidate by the Constitutional Court, and the Milli Majlis is constituted upon confirmation in office of 83 deputies. Every year, Milli Majlis of the Republic of Azerbaijan holds two regular, spring and autumn, sessions. Extraordinary sessions of Milli Majlis of the Republic of Azerbaijan will be summoned by the Chairman of Milli Majlis of the Republic of Azerbaijan at request of the President of the Republic of Azerbaijan or 42 deputies of Milli Majlis of the Republic of Azerbaijan. Agenda of extraordinary session will be prepared by those who summoned said session. After the questions of agenda have been discussed extraordinary session ends.  The assemblies of the sessions of the Milli Majlis of the Republic of Azerbaijan shall be open to the public. An assembly of the session of the Milli Majlis may be closed to the public upon the claim of 83 members of parliament or the proposal by the President of the Republic of Azerbaijan. The assembly is headed by the Speaker of Milli Majlis assisted by the First Deputy Speaker and two deputy speakers. Ogtay Asadov is the current speaker of the assembly, Ziyafet Asgarov is the First Deputy Speaker and, Bahar Muradova and Valeh Alasgarov are deputy speakers. Currently (for the term of 2015-2010) 21 women and 104 men deputies are elected in National Assembly. National Assembly is divided into 15 Committees according to the areas they are focused. Its structure also includes Chamber of Accounts, Toponymic Commission, Disciplinary Commission and Azerbaijan newspaper.

A legislative initiative can be taken by an MP, the President of the Republic, the Supreme Court, the Prosecutor's Office, the NAR Supreme Council and a group of 40 thousand citizens who are eligible to vote. The Nakhchivan Autonomous Republic  is a constituent part of Azerbaijan with its own elected parliament (the Supreme Council) consisting of 45 deputies. Elections to the Supreme Council are regulated by the Nakhchivan Constitution.

Political parties and elections

Azerbaijan is considered a one party dominant state. Opposition parties against the New Azerbaijan Party are allowed, but are widely considered to have no real chance of gaining power.

Presidential elections

Parliamentary elections

Cabinet of Ministers 

The Cabinet of Ministers is the supreme body of the Executive Power of the Republic of Azerbaijan under the President and the governing body of the ministries. Obeys the Cabinet of the President. The Cabinet of Ministers is formed after the appointment of the President and is subordinate to him and may be dismissed on the orders of the President. The Prime Minister is the Chairman of the Cabinet of Ministers. The Prime Minister is appointed by the President of the Republic of Azerbaijan with the approval of his candidature by the Milli Mejlis.

The Cabinet of Ministers of the Republic of Azerbaijan consists of the Prime Minister, his deputies, ministers and heads of other central executive bodies. The Cabinet of Ministers dissolves upon assuming the office of the new President, who convenes a new Cabinet.

The powers of the Cabinet include drafting the state budget and presenting it to the president, executing the budget, implementing state economic and social programs, securing financial and credit and monetary policy, managing ministries and other executive bodies of the Republic of Azerbaijan.

The 8th Government of Azerbaijan is the cabinet in its current formation.

Judicial branch
Judicial power is administered by the Constitutional Court, the Supreme Court, the courts of appeal, ordinary and specialised courts. The judicial system and legal proceedings are determined by law, and the establishment of extraordinary courts is prohibited. The Supreme Court of Azerbaijan is a supreme judicial body on civil, criminal and other cases related to the execution of general and specialized courts. The Constitutional Court of Azerbaijan is the supreme body of constitutional justice on the matters attributed to its jurisdiction by the Constitution, with authority to interpret and apply the Constitution of Azerbaijan. The Constitutional Court consists of nine judges appointed for a non-renewable 15-year term. Judges of Constitutional Court of the Republic of Azerbaijan are appointed by Milli Majlis (National Assembly) of the Republic of Azerbaijan on recommendation by the President of the Republic of Azerbaijan.  Any person may appeal before it for the restoration of his/her infringed rights and freedoms. The 2003 Law on the Constitutional Court defines the Court's activities, as well as the status and duties of its judges. The Court's decisions are published and their execution is mandatory.

The court system comprises three instances. The first instance includes 86 district/city courts, 5 serious crime courts, 6 military courts and 7 economic courts. Cases are heard by a single judge or a panel of judges. The second instance consists of 6 courts of appeal (“higher courts”), and the third instance - the Supreme Court - is the highest judicial body for civil, criminal, economic and military matters. It reviews the decisions of appeal courts and clarifies judicial practice. The courts in the Nakhchivan Autonomous Republic are part of the court system. The Nakhchivan Autonomous Republic Supreme Court serves as the appeal instance and its rulings are considered in cassation by the Supreme Court of Azerbaijan. Judges are independent and bound by Constitution and respective laws ( Law on Judges and Courts, Law on Judicial Legal Council, Criminal and Legal Procedure Codes, etc.).  Judges possesses Constitutional immunity and may be called to criminal responsibility only in accordance with law. Two public unions of judges are functional - 1. Association of General Court Judges, 2. Association of Specialised Court Judges. The key judicial self-governing body is the Judicial Legal Council. Within its competence, it ensures the organisation and operation of courts, proposes the number of judges per court and decides on the selection, evaluation, promotion, transfer and disciplinary measures against judges Judicial-Legal Council is permanently functioning independent body and does not depend on legislative, executive and judicial authorities, local self-governments or legal and natural persons in organizational, financial and other matters. It is composed of 15 members and by law is bound to ensure transparency in its activity by broadcasting its sessions and granting free access to information on sessions and to civil society organizations to attend the sessions. Judicial Legal Council also form the Judges Selection Committee vested with a selection of candidates for the vacant judicial posts and administers the selection process. It is  composed of 11 members, including judges, Council staff, representatives of the relevant executive body of the Republic of Azerbaijan and the Prosecutor's Office as well as, defense lawyers and academicians.

According to the Constitution of the Azerbaijan Republic, the Prosecutor's Office is defined as a part of the Judicial branch. Prosecutors Office via the procedure and in cases specified by legislation exercises control over fulfilment and application of laws; in cases envisaged by legislation it undertakes prosecution and carries out investigation; supports state incrimination in the law court; brings in action in the law court; remonstrates against decisions of law court.

Nakhchivan Autonomous Republic 
The Nakhchivan Autonomous Republic is autonomous state within the Republic of Azerbaijan. Its status is defined by Constitution and is an integral part of the Republic of Azerbaijan. Constitution of the Republic of Azerbaijan, laws of the Republic of Azerbaijan, decrees of the President of the Republic of Azerbaijan and resolutions of Cabinet of Ministers of the Republic of Azerbaijan are obligatory on the territory of Nakhchivan Autonomous Republic. Constitution and laws of the Nakhchivan Autonomous Republic adopted by Ali Majlis of Nakhchivan Autonomous Republic shall not contradict respectively to Constitution and laws of the Republic of Azerbaijan. Legislative power in the Nakhchivan Autonomous Republic is implemented by Ali Majlis of the Nakhchivan Autonomous Republic, executive power - by the Cabinet of Ministers of Nakhchivanan Autonomous Republic, judicial power - by law courts of Nakhchivan Autonomous Republic. Chairman of Ali Majlis of Nakhchivan Autonomous Republic is the highest official of Nakhchivan Autonomous Republic.

Municipalities 
Local self-government in Azerbaijan is governed by municipalities. Elections to municipalities and the status of municipalities are established by the National Assembly of the Republic of Azerbaijan. Within the framework of the sovereignty of the Republic of Azerbaijan, municipalities are independent in exercising their powers. The state controls the implementation of the activities of municipalities. The municipalities submit the activity report to the National Assembly of the Republic of Azerbaijan. Municipalities are responsible to citizens of the Republic of Azerbaijan.

Every citizen of the Republic of Azerbaijan, who has the right to participate in elections and who permanently resides in the respective constituencies, may be elected as a member of the municipality. Elections to the municipality are held every 5 years.

Municipalities organize their work through meetings that are convened by the chairman of municipalities. The chairman is elected at the meetings of the municipality. In addition, the rules of the local government, the powers of its members, the local budget and its implementation, taxes and fees are approved at meetings, local programs of social protection, social and economic development, and economic programs are adopted. In the municipalities of the Republic of Azerbaijan, decisions are taken by a majority of the members of the municipality.

Administrative divisions

Foreign relations

Azerbaijan is a member of the United Nations, the Organization for Security and Cooperation in Europe, NATO's Partnership for Peace, Euro-Atlantic Partnership; World Health Organization, the European Bank for Reconstruction and Development; the Council of Europe, CFE Treaty, the Community of Democracies; the International Monetary Fund; and the World Bank.

Turkey (the first country to recognize Azerbaijan's independence) has been a staunch supporter of Azerbaijan in its efforts to consolidate its independence, preserve its territorial integrity and realize its economic potential arising from the rich natural resources of the Caspian Sea. The Turkish cultural close ties with Azerbaijan is summarized by the slogan "One nation, two countries".

Armenia supports ethnic Armenians in the Nagorno-Karabakh region of Azerbaijan in the longstanding and very bitter separatist conflict against the Azerbaijani Government; the two countries are still at war, a cease-fire has been in place since 1994 but the fire has been renewed on 27 September 2020. (See Nagorno-Karabakh conflict and 2020 Nagorno-Karabakh conflict).

Azerbaijan is one of the few countries with predominantly Muslim populations that shares a strategic alliance with Israel. Today, Israel is a major arms supplier to the country. (See Azerbaijan–Israel relations).

Azerbaijan also maintains good relations with the European Union, in the framework of its Eastern European Neighbourhood Policy (See Azerbaijan and the European Union).

Azerbaijan was elected as one of the members of the newly established Human Rights Council (HRC) by the General Assembly on May 9, 2006. Term of office began on June 19, 2006.

Military

The Azerbaijan Armed Forces consists of four military branches: the army, navy, air force, and air defense forces. The national armed forces of Azerbaijan were formed by presidential decree in October 1991.

In July 1992, Azerbaijan ratified the Treaty on Conventional Armed Forces in Europe (CFE), which establishes comprehensive limits on key categories of conventional military equipment and provides for the destruction of weaponry in excess of those limits.

See also
 Heydar Aliyev's cult of personality
 Judiciary of Azerbaijan

References

Sources
 Baas, Reyer (March 3, 2003). "Een lange weg voor Azerbeidzjan". The Alfred Mozer Foundation.
 CIA World Factbook 2000 and the 2003 U.S. Department of State website
 Forrest, Brett (November 28, 2005). "Over A Barrel in Baku". Fortune, pp. 54–60.

Further reading 
 Franke, Anja/Gawrich, Andrea/Alakbarov, Gurban (2009): Kazakhstan and Azerbaijan as Post-Soviet Rentier States: Resource Incomes and Autocracy as a Double 'Curse' in Post-Soviet Regimes. In: Europe-Asia Studies, 61/1: 109–140.
 Guliyev, Farid (2005). Post-Soviet Azerbaijan: Transition to Sultanistic Semiauthoritarianism? An Attempt at Conceptualization. Demokratizatsiya: The Journal of Post-Soviet Democratization 13 (3): 393–435.
 Küpeli, Ismail (2010): Stabilisierung autoritärer Herrschaft: Das Fallbeispiel Aserbaidschan. Universität Duisburg-Essen, Duisburg 2010.
 Sidikov, Bahodir (2008): Aserbaidschan – Machtpoker um Petrodollars. In: Marie-Carin von Gumppenberg/Udo Steinbach (Hg.): Der Kaukasus: Geschichte – Kultur – Politik. München, S. 49–63.

External links
 Free Political Journal
 President of the Republic
 Constitutional Court
 The Political System of Azerbaijan. Articles in the Caucasus Analytical Digest No. 24
 The national symbols of the Republic of Azerbaijan

 

bn:আজারবাইজান#রাজনীতি